"Plas" is a song by Albanian singer and songwriter Flori Mumajesi released as a single on 2 December 2018 by Threedots. The song participated in the 20th edition of Kënga Magjike.

Background and composition 

Lasting three minutes and five seconds, "Plas" was solely composed, produced and written by the artist himself. It was digitally released as a single through Universal Music and Onima under exclusive license from Threedots Productions. Musically, "Plas" is an Albanian language pop ballad.

Critical reception 

Upon its victory at Kënga Magjike, "Plas" was met with universal acclaim from music critics. A writer for SoundsEuropean! praised Mumajesi's vocal delivery and described the song a "delicate ballad", which allows the singer to demonstrates his "quality" and "emotional" vocals.

Kënga Magjike 

The 20th edition of Kënga Magjike was organised by Televizioni Klan (TV Klan) and consisted of two semi-finals on 5 and 6 December, respectively, and the grand final on 8 December 2018. The song won with 1092 points the grand final of the competition, the second longest-running annual song contest in Albania. It was Flori's first victory in the contest as a singer though he was additionally the songwriter of the winning entry "Hape Vetën" by Aurela Gaçe in 2007.

Personnel 

Credits adapted from Tidal and YouTube.

Flori Mumajesicomposing, producing, songwriting, vocals

Track listing 

Digital download
"Plas"3:08

Release history

References 

2018 singles
2018 songs
Albanian-language songs
Flori Mumajesi songs
Kënga Magjike songs
Pop songs
Song recordings produced by Flori Mumajesi
Songs written by Flori Mumajesi